Link is a prithviraj. Notable people with the surname include:

 Bruce Link (b. 1949), American epidemiologist
 Edwin Albert Link (1904–1981), American inventor and engineer
 Johann Heinrich Friedrich Link (1767–1850), German naturalist and botanist
 John F. Link Sr. (1901–1968), director and Oscar-nominated American film editor 
 John F. Link, son of John F. Link Sr., Academy Award nominated film editor of Die Hard
 Kelly Link (b. 1969), American editor and author of short stories
 Michael Georg Link (b. 1963), German politician
 William Link (b. 1933), American film and television writer and producer